The Spencer Museum of Art is an art museum operated by the University of Kansas in Lawrence, Kansas. Accredited by the American Alliance of Museums, the Spencer Museum seeks to "...present its collection as a living archive that motivates object-centered research and teaching, creative work, and transformative public dialogue."

History
In 1917, the Kansas City art collector Sallie Casey Thayer donated her collection of over seven thousand works of art, primarily from Asia and Europe to the University of Kansas to form a museum in order to encourage the study of fine arts in the Midwestern United States. In 1928, the school established the University of Kansas Museum of Art, with Thayer's collection as the basis, within Spooner Hall. By the 1960s, under the directorship of Marilyn Stokstad, the Museum of Art outgrew the space.

In 1978, Helen Foresman Spencer, another female Kansas City collector, made a substantial gift to fund the construction of a new space, under the directorship of Charles C. Eldredge. The new building was designed by the architect and Class of 1926 alum Robert E. Jenks in the Neoclassical style from Indiana limestone. The museum was renamed in honor of Helen to the Spencer Museum of Art. From 1976 to 1983, Elizabeth Broun served as Curator of Prints and Drawings, as well as a stint as Acting Director from 1982 to 1983, succeeding Eldredge. Since then, the museum has only been led by three individuals: Jay Gates, Andrea Norris, and Saralyn Reece Hardy.

In 2007, the Spencer Museum of Art grew when over nine thousand objects from the former University of Kansas Museum of Anthropology were transferred to its possession. The collection included a wide variety of global cultural materials, with emphasis on Native American materials.

In 2016, the Spencer Museum of Art completed the first phase of a major renovation project, led by the architectural firm Pei Cobb Freed & Partners. In addition to transforming over 30,000 square feet of the space, the Stephen H. Goddard Study Center and the Jack and Lavon Brosseau Center for Learning were both added. In that same year, the museum received a grant totaling over $450,000 from the Andrew W. Mellon Foundation to support interdisciplinary research. Three years later, an additional $650,000 was awarded.

Collection
The Spencer Museum of Art houses over 47,000 objects in a variety of media. In particular, the collection broadly covers American and European art from ancient to contemporary times, as well as Asian art from various periods. Areas of particular strength include: American and European paintings, Japanese art from the Edo period, and medieval art.

Directors
 Marilyn Stokstad (1961–1968)
 Charles C. Eldredge (1971–1982)
 Elizabeth Broun (1982–1983)
 Jay Gates (1983–1987)
 Andrea Norris (1988–2004)
 Saralyn Reece Hardy (2005–present)

Gallery

References

External links
Official website
Virtual tour of the Spencer Museum of Art provided by Google Arts & Culture

1928 establishments in Kansas
Art museums established in 1928
Art museums and galleries in Kansas
Museums in Douglas County, Kansas
Tourist attractions in Lawrence, Kansas
University museums in Kansas
University of Kansas campus
Lawrence, Kansas